The Galician Workers Union (SOG, Sindicato Obreiro Galego in Galician language), was a Galician nationalist and anticapitalist union in Galiza.

Its official publication was O Eixo, editing at the same time other comarcal and sectorial publications. The SOG was founded in May 1975 when the Frente Obreiro (Workers Front) of the Galician People's Union decided to become a union. The SOG was part of the Galician National Popular Assembly (AN-PG). The SOG defended "combative" unionism and rejected any kind o collaboration with the Patronal.

In April 1976 the organization held its first General Assembly. However, it disappeared just a year later, in March 1977 to found, with other unions, the Intersindical Nacional Galega (ING).

References

 Various authors (2009), Moncho Reboiras. O nacionalismo nos 70. Fundación Bautista Álvarez de Estudos Nacionalistas, Santiago de Compostela Authorised version in PDF.
  Dionisio Pereira, Uxío-Breogán Diéguez and Bernardo Máiz (2010), Síntese histórica do movemento obreiro galego, das orixes até 1984.FESGA, A Coruña. Authorised version in PDF.

1975 establishments in Spain
National trade union centers of Spain
Trade unions in Spain
Socialism
Galician nationalism